The Arizona Complex League Rangers are a Rookie-level affiliate of the Texas Rangers, competing in the Arizona Complex League of Minor League Baseball. The team plays its home games at Surprise Stadium in Surprise, Arizona. The team is composed mainly of players who are in their first year of professional baseball either as draftees or non-drafted free agents.

History
The team began play in 2003 in the Arizona League (AZL), succeeding the Texas Rangers' prior rookie team, the Florida-based Gulf Coast League Rangers.

The team has captured two league championships, in 2010 and 2019. Prior to the 2021 season, the Arizona League was renamed as the Arizona Complex League (ACL).

Roster

Notable alumni

Notable players for the team include:

 Jordan Akins
 Jorge Alfaro
 Alex Claudio
 John Danks
 Jerad Eickhoff
 Scott Feldman
 Armando Galarraga
 Joey Gallo
 Odúbel Herrera
 Derek Holland
 Keone Kela
 Michael Kirkman
 Gerald Laird
 Nomar Mazara
 Mike Olt
 Zach Phillips
 Edinson Vólquez

References

External links
 Official website

2003 establishments in Arizona
Arizona Complex League teams
Baseball teams established in 2003
Professional baseball teams in Arizona
Texas Rangers minor league affiliates